Events from the year 1831 in Sweden

Incumbents
 Monarch – Charles XIV John

Events
 22 August - The premier of Nornan by Julia Nyberg at the Royal Swedish Opera i Stockholm.
 - Inauguration of Wallinska skolan in Stockholm.
 - Lunds Studentsångförening is created
 - First issue of Vestmanlands Läns Tidning

Births
 16 March – Elise Hwasser, actress   (died 1894) 
 28 August - Ludvig Norman, composer, conductor, pianist, and music teacher (died 1885) 
 14 November - Betty Deland, actress (died 1882)

Deaths

 18 July – Adolf Fredrik Munck, royal favorite (born 1749)
 Charlotta Richardy, industrialist   (born 1751)

References

 
Years of the 19th century in Sweden